Pyeongtaek is a city in Gyeonggi Province, South Korea. Located in the southwestern part of the province, Pyeongtaek was founded as a union of two districts in 1940, during the Goryeo dynasty. It was elevated to city status in 1986 and is home to a South Korean naval base and a large concentration of United States troops. The South Korean government plans to transform Pyeongtaek city to an international economic hub to coincide with the move of the United States Forces Korea (USFK) to Pyeongtaek. During the Korean War, it was the site of an early battle between U.S. and North Korean forces, the Battle of Pyongtaek. It is the location of Pyeongtaek University.

Military base
The South Korean and United States governments came to an agreement to enlarge Camp Humphreys — a U.S. Army installation outside Anjeong-ri, a community in Pyeongtaek — and move the majority of US forces stationed in and north of Seoul to the Camp Humphreys area. Invoking eminent domain, the government obtained the surrounding land for the base expansion. This would result in the community's third displacement from their own land since the Japanese occupation during World War II.

The move originally included the headquarters of the ROK/US Combined Forces Command, which has operational control of South Korean, U.S., and U.N. combined forces during wartime. In March 2007, ROK Minister of Defense Kim Jang-soo and U.S. Secretary of Defense Robert Gates agreed to dissolve the ROK-U.S. Combined Forces Command on April 17, 2012. This would allow ROK forces to have wartime control of its military during a military confrontation with the North. The ROK/US agreement allows USFK to move to one centralized location away from the congestion of Seoul and its surrounding areas. This relocation agreement results in returning two-thirds of the land currently used by the United States Military back to the South Korean government. By 2008, the U.S. military was to have consolidated 41 installations down to 10 due to the relocation agreement. USFK's only jail facility in South Korea is at Camp Humphreys.
 
Osan Air Base is in Songtan, a district in Pyeongtaek City.

South African War Memorial
The Korean War Monument of the South African Air Force was opened on 29 September 1975 by the Korean National ministry of Defense in memory to the 37 South African Air Force members who served during the Korean War.

Education

 Hankwang High School
 Pyeongtaek University.
 Pyeongtaek International Christian School.

Climate
Pyeongtaek has a humid continental climate (Köppen: Dwa), but can be considered a borderline humid subtropical climate (Köppen: Cwa) using the  isotherm.

Notable people 
 Park Wan-Kyu, a Korean singer, the 5th and 11th vocalist of rock band resurrection.
 Lee Eun-Gyeol, a magician and illusionist in Korea.
 Won Kyun, A military general of the mid Joseon Dynasty who served during the Imjin War.

Notes
  U.S. Move Is Spurring Evictions In S. Korea (Washington Post article)
  Massive Force Mobilized to Evict U.S. Base Protestors (Chosun Ilbo article (English))
  Activists Are Only Using the People of Pyeontaek (Chosun Ilbo English Editorial) article
  More Violence Looms in Planned Rally at U.S. Base Site
  U.S. base expansion in Korea sparks protests (Socialism and Liberation) article

See also
 Camp Humphreys
 Songtan
 USFK
 List of cities in South Korea
 Geography of South Korea

References

External links

Pyeongtaek City Website  
Pyeongtaek City Council Website  
South of Seoul: Pyeongtaek Based Restaurants & Things to Do
MollaKorea: Community website for foreigners living in Pyeongtaek Area
Sig Flips The Table: Blog for Military Families living in Pyeongtaek

 

 
Cities in Gyeonggi Province
Populated places established in 1986
Port cities and towns in South Korea
1986 establishments in South Korea
South African military memorials and cemeteries